Derrick Bryan Clark (27 December 1935 – 1985) was an English footballer who made five appearances in the Football League playing as a forward for Darlington.

Notes

References

1935 births
1985 deaths
People from Leyburn
English footballers
Association football forwards
Darlington F.C. players
English Football League players
Footballers from Yorkshire